Gianluca Bazzica (born 2 November 1975) is an Italian former professional tennis player.

Bazzica reached career best rankings of 595 in singles and 176 in doubles. Most successful in doubles, he won three ITF Futures titles, finished runner-up in four ATP Challenger finals and made an ATP Tour main draw appearance at the 2004 Generali Open Kitzbühel.

ATP Challenger/ITF Futures finals

Doubles: 11 (3–8)

References

External links
 
 

1975 births
Living people
Italian male tennis players